Terry Toh (born 1974) is a Singapore chess International Master. He won the national Singaporean Chess Championship in 1995.  Represented Singapore in the 1994 Chess Olympiad. His current FIDE rating is 2419.

References

External links
 
 
 An Interview with IM Terry "Magic" Toh

1974 births
Living people
Singaporean sportspeople of Chinese descent
Singaporean chess players
Chess International Masters
Chess Olympiad competitors
20th-century Singaporean people